Matheus França de Oliveira (born 1 April 2004) is a Brazilian footballer who plays as an Attacking Midfielder for Campeonato Brasileiro Série A club Flamengo.

Club career

Early Career
França arrived at Flamengo at the age of 12, after being one of the highlights of Olaria. At Flamengo youth team he has been considered, alongside Lázaro, one of the club's greatest young players after Vinícius Júnior.

Flamengo
França debuted in the Flamengo's professional team on 6 December 2021 in a Campeonato Brasileiro Série A match against Santos at Maracanã Stadium, he replaced Éverton Ribeiro on the 78th minute.

On 25 January 2022, Flamengo extented França's contract until 30 April 2027.

On 23 February 2023, França extended his contract with Flamengo until 31 December 2028.

International career
França has played internationally for Brazil at under-16 level with six appearances.

França has been called-up to the represent Brazil U20 at the 2023 South American U-20 Championship, but Flamengo asked for his release to play in the FIFA Club World Cup.

Career statistics

Honours
Flamengo
Copa Libertadores: 2022
Copa do Brasil: 2022

References

External links

2004 births
Living people
Brazilian footballers
Association football forwards
CR Flamengo footballers
Copa Libertadores-winning players
Campeonato Brasileiro Série A players
Footballers from Rio de Janeiro (city)